The 2014–15 Handball-Bundesliga was the 50th season of the Handball-Bundesliga, Germany's premier handball league and the 38th season consisting of only one league.

Team information
19 teams competed this year.

Standings

Results

References

External links
Official website 

Handball-Bundesliga
2014–15 domestic handball leagues
2014 in German sport
2015 in German sport